Ruth Ann Steinhagen (born Ruth Catherine Steinhagen; December 23, 1929 – December 29, 2012) was an American woman who shot and nearly killed Eddie Waitkus, star first baseman of the Philadelphia Phillies, on June 14, 1949, in one of the first instances of what later became known as stalker crimes. The incident is one of the inspirations for the 1952 baseball book The Natural, made into a film in 1984.

Early life 

Steinhagen was the daughter of parents who had emigrated from Berlin, Germany in their early 20s. Born Ruth Catherine Steinhagen, she adopted the middle name Ann at some point in her youth.

Prelude to the incident 

A 19-year-old typist at the time of the incident, Steinhagen had developed an obsession with Waitkus after seeing him play as first baseman with the Chicago Cubs. According to a 1949 Time magazine article, she had seen him play in 1946, although John Theodore's 2002 biography of Waitkus indicates she later told her doctor she first saw Waitkus on April 27, 1947.

While she never actually met him during that time, at home she created a "shrine" to Waitkus with hundreds of photographs and newspaper clippings, often spreading them out and looking at them for hours, according to her mother. She would even set an empty place across from her at dinner for Waitkus. Since the ballplayer was from the Boston area, she developed a craving for baked beans, and, because Waitkus was of Lithuanian descent, she even studied Lithuanian for a time.

She told her doctors, after the incident, "I used to go to all the ball games to watch him. We used to wait for them to come out of the clubhouse after the game, and all the time I was watching I was building in my mind that idea of killing him." In 1948, Steinhagen's family sent her to a psychiatrist, but her obsession didn't diminish, even after Waitkus was traded to Philadelphia. After the shooting, police found extensive clippings in her suitcase and even pictures papering the ceiling of her bedroom.

The shooting 

On June 14, 1949, the Phillies came to Chicago for a game against the Cubs. After the game, which she attended, Steinhagen sent Waitkus a handwritten note through a bellboy, inviting him to visit her in her 12th floor room in the Edgewater Beach Hotel where they were both registered. Claiming to be "Ruth Anne Burns," Waitkus opened her note:

After insisting that she was leaving the hotel the next day and pressing the timeliness of the request, she concluded:

According to Waitkus' friend and roommate, Russ Meyer, Waitkus received the note, which was affixed to the door of their 9th-floor room, after 11:00 p.m., after having been out to dinner with Meyer's family and fiancée. Waitkus called the room but the woman would not discuss the details over the phone. According to Meyer, Waitkus believed the note was from a friend of Ruth Ann Burns, a woman whom he was dating. The Sunday Gazette Mail says Waitkus knew some people named Burns. Waitkus's son later speculated that his father may have "thought he had a hot honey on the line." For whatever reason, he went to meet her in the room.

There is variance in the details of what happened in the room. According to an Associated Press report released on June 15, 1949, Steinhagen told police that she told Waitkus when he entered, "I have a surprise for you," before retrieving a .22 rifle from the closet and shooting him in the chest. Meyer said that Waitkus told him that when he entered the room, the woman he met claimed to be a friend of Ruth Ann's, introducing herself as Mary Brown, and saying that Ruth Ann would be returning to the room immediately. He said that Waitkus claimed Steinhagen's words after retrieving the gun from the closet were "If I can't have you, nobody else can." A 2001 Chicago Times story claims that Steinhagen said, "You're not going to bother me anymore." Waitkus, who later said he believed the woman was joking, stood and was shot. He said he asked her, as she knelt beside his prone body with her hand on his, "Oh, baby, what did you do that for?"

Steinhagen indicated that she had planned to stab him, and use the gun to shoot herself, but changed her plans when he quickly took a seat. Steinhagen still intended to shoot herself, but evidently could not find another bullet. While Waitkus was lying on the floor bleeding from the chest, Steinhagen called down to the front desk of the hotel and told them "I just shot a man ..." Thereafter, according to a Miami News report released on the following day, she went to wait for them on the benches near the elevator, although a much later article in The Washington Times indicates she held Waitkus' head on her lap until help arrived.

The phone call, which brought quick medical attention as well as police, saved Waitkus' life.

The aftermath 

Steinhagen was arrested and then arraigned on June 30, 1949. Questioned about the shooting, she told police she did not know why she had done it, telling an assistant state's attorney that she wanted "to do something exciting in my life."

Taken to Waitkus' hospital room the day after the shooting, she told him, as well, that she didn't know for sure why she had done it. She told a psychiatrist before she went to court that "I didn't want to be nervous all my life", and explained to reporters that "the tension had been building up within me, and I thought killing someone would relieve it"— a murderous impulse that had been with her for at least two years. She said she had first seen Waitkus three years before, and that he reminded her "of everybody, especially my father."

Steinhagen's counsel presented a petition to the court saying that their client was "unable to cooperate with counsel in the defense of her cause" and did not "understand the nature of the charge against her."  The petition requested a sanity hearing.  At the ensuing sanity hearing (which also occurred on June 30, 1949), Dr. William Haines, a court-appointed psychiatrist, testified that Steinhagen had "schizophrenia in an immature individual" and was mentally ill.  Chief Judge James McDermott of the Criminal Court of Cook County then directed the jury to find her insane, and ordered her committed to Kankakee State Hospital. The judge also struck "with leave to reinstate" the grand jury's indictment of Steinhagen on a charge of assault with intent to commit murder, meaning that prosecutors could refile the charge if Steinhagen recovered her sanity.

Steinhagen was confined and treated at the institution until 1952, when she was declared cured and released. Waitkus did not press charges against Steinhagen after she was released, telling an assistant state's attorney that he wanted to forget the incident.

After her release, Steinhagen moved back home to live with her parents and her younger sister in her parents' small apartment on Chicago's North Side. She shunned publicity in the ensuing decades. Little information is publicly available about the remainder of her life, which was quiet and secluded.  She steadfastly maintained her privacy, avoided reporters, and refused to comment publicly on her shooting of Waitkus.  Waitkus biographer John Theodore said about her, "She chose to live in the shadows and she did a good job of it."

It is known that, in 1970, Steinhagen and her family purchased a home in a crowded, racially mixed neighborhood on Chicago's Northwest Side, a few miles from the site of the hotel where she shot Waitkus. She lived in the home for the rest of her life.  She lived there with her sister after their parents died in the early 1990s.  She continued to live there after her sister died in 2007, employing full-time caregivers in her final years.  There is no evidence she ever married.  Discoverable evidence of employment that she may have had is virtually nonexistent.  A neighbor of hers told John Theodore that Steinhagen had said that she worked in an office job for 35 years, but Steinhagen never told the neighbor where she worked and the neighbor never asked her. Court records and other background checks reveal no information about her career.

On December 29, 2012, Steinhagen died in a Chicago hospital of a subdural hematoma that was the result of an accidental fall in her home. Her death was not publicly reported until nearly three months after it occurred; the Chicago Tribune learned of it while searching death records in connection with another story. Steinhagen was 83 years old, and left no immediate survivors.

Influence 

As one of the first instances of what later became known as stalker crimes, the incident for several years "had a profoundly anti-aphrodisiacal effect on traveling athletes", according to The Boston Globe. It prompted a magazine article from sports writer Al Stump entitled "Baseball's Biggest Headache— Dames!" It was fictionalized as one of the inspirations for the 1952 baseball book The Natural, which was made into a film in 1984, where actress Barbara Hershey played the role, inspired by Steinhagen. In 1992, Steinhagen's was the oldest incident among 83 incorporated into "Preventing Assassination", a Secret Service study of celebrity and political assassinations.

The bullet that struck Waitkus lodged in a lung, threatening his life and preventing his returning to baseball for the rest of the season. The incident, which required four surgeries, is said to have influenced Waitkus' career and probably his personal life as well, as his numbers after the shooting were never the same and as he developed a great concern that others might not understand why he had visited Steinhagen's room. He also, according to Meyer, developed a drinking problem after the incident.

Footnotes

References

External links 
Jack Bales, "The Shootings of Billy Jurges and Eddie Waitkus," WrigleyIvy.com.
 
 

1929 births
2012 deaths
People from Chicago
American female criminals
People declared mentally unfit for court
Stalking
American people of German descent